Mitochondrial thiamine pyrophosphate carrier is a protein that in humans is encoded by the SLC25A19 gene.

See also
 Solute carrier family

References

Further reading

External links
  GeneReviews/NCBI/NIH/UW entry on Amish Lethal Microcephaly
  OMIM entries on Amish Lethal Microcephaly

Solute carrier family